Kerman Unified School District is a public school district based in Fresno County, California, United States.

Schools
 Kerman High School
 Kerman Middle School
 Enterprise High School (formerly Nova High School)
 Sun Empire Elementary School
 Kerman-Floyd Elementary School
 Goldenrod Elementary School
 Liberty Elementary School

External links
 

School districts in Fresno County, California
1983 establishments in California
School districts established in 1983